Clotilde Fasolis (born 22 July 1951) is an Italian former alpine skier. She competed at the 1968 Winter Olympics  in the downhill, slalom and giant slalom events with the best results of 22nd place in the slalom. She was the flag bearer for Italy at the 1968 Winter Olympics.

References

External links
 

1951 births
Living people
Italian female alpine skiers
Olympic alpine skiers of Italy
Alpine skiers at the 1968 Winter Olympics
20th-century Italian women